Vladimir Sournin (1 August 1875, Mstislavl, Russia – 21 August 1942, Baltimore, USA) was a Russian-American chess master.

Chess career 
In 1896, he lost a match to Frank James Marshall (+2 –7 =2) in New York. He played at Ostend 1906 (elim.), took 19th at St Petersburg 1911 (Stepan Levitsky won), and tied for 14–15th at Vilna 1912 (B tournament, Karel Hromádka won).

After World War I, he tied for 5-7th at Atlantic City 1921 (the Eighth American Chess Congress, Dawid Janowski won), took 9th at Lake Hopatcong 1923 (the Ninth ACC, Marshall and Abraham Kupchik won), and took 7th at St Louis 1929 (Hahlbohm won).

References 

1875 births
1942 deaths
Chess players from the Russian Empire
American chess players
Emigrants from the Russian Empire to the United States